The 1920 Grand Prix season saw further activity in motor-racing gradually increase. Europe was still recovering from the end of the war and the terrible pandemic that swept the continent. Automotive companies were gradually re-establishing themselves after re-tooling from a wartime footing and getting production lines rolling again.

A new 3-litre formula was adopted on both sides of the Atlantic and the Indianapolis 500 would be a close contest between the best of the new designs from France and the USA. Ralph DePalma led for over half the race in his Ballot, only for it to catch fire with four laps to go. Gaston Chevrolet inherited the lead and held on to win by six minutes. His Monroe-Frontenac was the first American car to win the great race since 1912. DePalma got his revenge later in the year, winning the last Elgin Trophy, on the only road-course in the AAA Championship. Chevrolet was later recognised as the season champion, but he was killed at the end of the year in a collision at the Beverley Hills race.

Racing was gradually returning to Europe, although there was no Grand Prix. Club racing started again at Brooklands. A new race at Mugello in Italy was won by veteran Giuseppe Campari in an Alfa Romeo. Voiturette racing resumed with the Coupe des Voiturettes held on a shortened circuit at Le Mans. It was won by Ernest Friderich in a Bugatti. Near the end of the year, the Targa Florio was run again on the island of Sicily. It was won by Guido Meregalli in a Nazzaro GP.

Major Races
Sources:

Regulations and Technical
At the end of 1919 the AIACR (forerunner of the FIA) had set down new regulations for motor-racing. An engine limit of 3.0-litres was imposed along with a minimum weight of 800kg. The AAA also adopted those regulations for their racing season. So, in line with this, the Indianapolis regulations also changed – with the maximum engine size reduced to 183 cu in (3.0 litres) from 300 cu in (4.92 litres).
The Targa Florio regulations were for production cars available to the public, divided into seven engine-capacity categories. Voiturette regulations were set at a maximum of 1400cc capacity engine, and weighing between 350 and 500kg.

The general unification of regulations encouraged manufacturers to build new designs that could run on both sides of the Atlantic. The new Peugeot had an intricate triple-overhead cam 3-litre engine with five valves per cylinder. As it would turn out, after a decade of leading racing development, this would be the last grand prix car designed and built by Peugeot. Ernest Henry followed up his Indianapolis design for Ballot with a new car with a 3-litre straight-eight engine.

Louis Chevrolet, as well as building a new Frontenac, was engaged by Indianapolis industrialist William Small, of the Monroe Motor Car Company, to build four 3-litre specials.

In June, Sunbeam, bought out the French Talbot and British-owned Darracq companies, setting up the headquarters of the new company, STD Motors, in Paris.

Season review

With a $20000 first prize, and lucrative bonuses, a strong field was entered for the International Sweepstakes. It essentially turned out to be a showdown between two French and two American teams. Works teams arrived from Ballot and Peugeot, both with their new 3-litre cars and strong driver line-ups. Ballot had former winners  René Thomas and Ralph DePalma with Jean Chassagne. Peugeot had current holder Howdy Wilcox with Jules Goux and André Boillot.
There were five Monroe-Frontenacs present. The four ‘works’ team cars were driven by Louis and Gaston Chevrolet, Roscoe Sarles and Joe Thomas, as well as three cars from the Frontenac factory (Joe Boyer, Art Klein, Bennett Hill). There were also four new 3-litre Duesenberg cars entered for their team – to be driven by Tommy Milton, Eddie Hearn, Eddie O'Donnell and a rookie Jimmy Murphy.

This year, a new qualifying system was used with a four lap, 10-mile, time taken. A record crowd of 120000 arrived on race day. Ralph DePalma had been fastest, sharing the front row with the two Chevrolet brothers. But he lost all advantage when Barney Oldfield, in the pace-car left the line early before he was ready. Then a tyre problem lost the veteran driver a lap straight away. This left Boyer to set the early pace from his team-mate Klein, Gaston Chevrolet and the Ballots of Thomas and Chassagne, though Thomas briefly took the lead during the pit-stops. 
The Monroes and Frontenacs were then affected by the same issue: Klein slid into the wall on lap 58, then Sarles and Louis Chevrolet did the same. They were traced to badly cast steering arms. Then Sarles then took over Hill's Frontenac but the same fault spun him out – this time right in front of the Ballots of Thomas and Chassagne who narrowly avoided him.

By the halfway point DePalma had not only made back the lap but overtaken Boyer to lead. The race built up to a dramatic finish. DePalma was leading from Chevrolet, with Chassagne and Thomas close behind. Then with thirteen laps to go, DePalma's engine caught fire. In the pits he found a faulty magneto was leaving unspent fuel in the cylinders. He rejoined the race in fifth, running on four cylinders. A few laps later, the steering arm on Boyer's Frontenac broke, then in his pursuit of Chevrolet, Chassagne hit the wall. With the pressure off, Gaston Chevrolet held on to win by six minutes from the Ballot of Thomas, with Milton and his Duesenberg barely ten seconds back in third. DePalma was fifth, thirty minutes behind and Chassagne seventh. All the Peugeots had retired. Chevrolet had got through the race without taking a single tyre-change, and his Monroe-Frontenac was the first win by an American car at Indianapolis since 1912.

On 25 November, Gaston Chevrolet and Eddie O'Donnell collided when racing at the last race of the championship, at the new Beverley Hills track. Both drivers were killed. Chevrolet's win at Indianapolis gave him sufficient points to be posthumously awarded the AAA championship from Tommy Milton in the abbreviated season of five races. For a long while Milton had been named as champion when a revision had been made for an eleven-race season. But further research showed that, at the time, the AAA had indeed only proscribed the five races in their championship. 

Motorsport was gradually returning to Europe. Racing restarted at Brooklands in April with its Easter Handicap, won by Malcolm Campbell. At the end of August, a meeting was held at Le Mans for smaller cars - le Meeting de la Reprise - with a race for cyclecars on the Saturday and another for voiturettes up to 1400cc on Sunday. With limited finance, the ACO could not afford to repair their former long course used from 1911 to 1913. So a far shorter 17km course based on a portion of it was set up. This would subsequently be used for the classic 24 Hours of Le Mans.

Twenty-two cars were entered, including works teams from Bugatti, Bignan, Majola and Eric-Campbell (who had René Thomas as a driver). From the start, the Bugatti team was dominant. Pierre de Vizcaya, Ernest Friderich and Michele Baccoli moved straight into the top-three places. De Vizcaya was comfortably leading when he came in for his last fuel stop. However, Ettore Bugatti in his enthusiasm, checked the car's water thereby getting his driver disqualified for outside assistance. This left Friderich to inherit the lead, and winning by a margin of 20 minutes from the Bignans of Nougue and Delauney.

 

Although this year's Targa Florio only attracted sixteen Italian starters, it was significant as it drew the attention of the new Alfa Romeo works team, Alfa Corse. Three cars were sent: a 1914 Grand prix car for Giuseppe Campari, a big 40/60 6-litre for newly signed Enzo Ferrari and a smaller 20/30 for Giuseppe Baldoni. Earlier in the year, Campari had won the inaugural road-race held around Mugello in Tuscany. The Targa entry list also included the Contessa Maria-Antoinetta d’Avanzo in an American Buick, a pioneer among women in motorsport.

Held again as four laps of the 108km medio Madonie, the drivers once more had to battle heavy rain and high winds. Although Ferrari put in the fastest lap, he was beaten to the victory by Guido Meregalli in a Nazzaro. Only seven cars finished, with the final driver completing the race over three hours behind Meregalli.

Citations

References
 Cimarosti, Adriano (1997)    The Complete History of Grand Prix Motor Racing    London: Aurum Press Ltd  
 Georgano, Nick (1971)    The Encyclopaedia of Motor Sport    London: Ebury Press Ltd  
 Higham, Peter (1995)    The Guinness Guide to International Motor Racing    London: Guinness Publishing  
 Ludvigsen, Karl (2008)    Racing Colours - Italian Racing Red    Surrey: Ian Allan Publishing Ltd  
 Monkhouse, George (1953)    Grand Prix Racing Facts and Figures   London: G.T. Foulis & Co Ltd
 Rendall, Ivan (1991)    The Power and The Glory – A Century of Motor Racing    London: BBC Books  
 Rendall, Ivan (1993)    The Chequered Flag – 100 years of Motor Racing    London: Weidenfeld & Nicolson Ltd  
 Spurring, Quentin (2015)    Le Mans 1923-29    Yeovil, Somerset: Haynes Publishing  
 Venables, David (2009)    Racing Colours - French Racing Blue    Surrey: Ian Allan Publishing Ltd

External links

  Grand Prix Winners 1895–1949 : Part 2 (1919–1933) – list of the races and winners. Retrieved 3 Oct 2019
  Grand Prix Winners 1895–1949 : History – Hans Etzrodt's description of the annual regulations, and changes. Retrieved 7 Jun 2019
  TeamDan  - list of the major races, entrants and results. Retrieved 10 Oct 2019
  SpeedFreaks  - list of the major races, entrants and results. Retrieved 10 Oct 2019
  6th Gear  - list of the major races and winners each year. Retrieved 10 Oct 2019
  La Targa Florio – race report and pictures of the Targa Florio. Retrieved 3 Oct 2019
  Driver Database  – race results of the Targa Florio. Retrieved 10 Oct 2019
  F2 Register – race results of the Targa Florio. Retrieved 3 Oct 2019
  Grand Prix History – history of the Targa Florio race. Retrieved 10 Oct 2019
  Motorsport Memorial – motor-racing deaths by year. Retrieved 10 Oct 2019
  1920 AAA Championship – list of all the races, entrants and results of the AAA Championship. Retrieved 10 Oct 2019
  Racing Reference.com – list of all the races and results of the AAA Championship. Retrieved 10 Oct 2019
  MotorSport magazine – race results of AAA championship. Retrieved 10 Oct 2019

Grand Prix seasons
1920 in motorsport
 
1920 in American motorsport